Roland Joseph Steinle (March 21, 1896December 22, 1966) was an American lawyer, jurist, and Republican politician from the U.S. state of Wisconsin.  He served four years on the Wisconsin Supreme Court and was the Republican nominee for United States Senator from Wisconsin in the 1958 election.

Biography

Born in Milwaukee, Wisconsin, Steinle served in the United States Army during World War I. He graduated from Marquette Law School, was in private law practice, and served as special district attorney. Steinle was appointed a Wisconsin circuit court judge in 1940, and was appointed to the Wisconsin Supreme Court in 1954.  In 1958, he abruptly resigned from the court to run for election to the United States Senate as a Republican. After losing the election to William Proxmire, Steinle returned to private practice and served as a circuit court commissioner.

Electoral history

Lieutenant Governor of Wisconsin (1936)

| colspan="6" style="text-align:center;background-color: #e9e9e9;"| General Election, November 7, 1936

Wisconsin Circuit Court (1940)

| colspan="6" style="text-align:center;background-color: #e9e9e9;"| General Election, April 5, 1940

Wisconsin Supreme Court (1954)

| colspan="6" style="text-align:center;background-color: #e9e9e9;"| Nonpartisan Primary, March 9, 1954

| colspan="6" style="text-align:center;background-color: #e9e9e9;"| General Election, April 6, 1954

U.S. Senate (1958)

| colspan="6" style="text-align:center;background-color: #e9e9e9;"| General Election, November 4, 1958

References

External links
 

1896 births
1966 deaths
Marquette University Law School alumni
Politicians from Milwaukee
Wisconsin lawyers
Wisconsin Republicans
Wisconsin state court judges
Justices of the Wisconsin Supreme Court
Military personnel from Milwaukee
20th-century American judges
Lawyers from Milwaukee
20th-century American lawyers